Ebenaqua ritchei is an extinct bobasatraniiform bony fish that lived during the Late Permian epoch, of what is now Blackwater, Queensland.  Fossils are found in the Rangal Coal Measures, which are Changhsingian in age.

See also

 Prehistoric fish
 List of prehistoric bony fish

References

Late Permian fish
Prehistoric fish of Australia